The Latvia national rugby union team represents Latvia at the sport of rugby union. They are governed by the Latvijas Regbija federācija and have been playing international rugby since the early 1990s. They have played most of their games in the Daugava Stadium in Riga.

History 
Rugby has increased in popularity in Latvia recently due to a rise in form. Despite minimal playing numbers, Latvia continue to compete at a high level, and had an outside chance of finishing top of Division 2A of the European Nations Cup. However their hopes took a massive blow, when they failed to capitalise on Poland's surprise home defeat to Croatia, losing 16-13 to Malta in Paola. Latvia is an improving rugby team as now more players are playing in Russia, Germany, and Canada.

Latvia won the 2018–19 Rugby Europe Conference 2 North and was promoted to Conference 1 North for the 2019–20 season.

The national side is ranked 58th in the world (as of 12 August 2019).

Current squad
The roster for the 2018–19 Rugby Europe Conference 2 North tournament match against Norway:

 Head coach:  Gary Walker

References

External links

Official website 

Teams in European Nations Cup (rugby union)
European national rugby union teams
Rugby union in Latvia
Rugby iunion